Jules Allen (born September 13, 1947) is a photographer and a tenured professor in
the Art & Photography Department of Queensboro Community College, City University of New York, where he has taught for two decades.  He was born in San Francisco, California.

He shares the belief of photographer Diane Arbus, who states, “the more specific a thing is, the more general.”  The artist, Danny Dawson has said, "Allen has a “keen eye for the obvious” in his lifelong work evocative of the contemporary black experience.  His images place subjects drawn from the richness of black life within universal paradigms. They have inspired collaborations with  journalists,  visual artists,  musicians, playwrights, poets, and filmmakers.

Allen also used his photographs to promote segregation and the idea that blacks and whites were truly equal. Allen comments on his collection depicting boxers in Gleason Gym by saying, “Whatever racism existed, it did not seem to have much effect on the fighters in the room. It was a question of character. It was a place where people seemed to be more equal”. Allen used the boxing ring and the sport itself to display the equality between blacks and whites as they were literally on even ground and the only difference between the two was the character of each fighter. It wasn’t a question of who was what race and who had more privilege, it was about the heart and drive of each of the fighters in the ring. 
	

Allen's books include Hats and HatNots, Black Bodies and 2011 publication on boxing life in  New York City's Gleason's Gym, Double Up: Photographs by Jules Allen, and the 2013 publication of "In Your Own Sweet Way," a personal and intimate collection of photographic conversations across the continent of Africa.  Exhibited in the U.S. and abroad, as shown in the Permanent Museum Collections & Exhibition listing below, he is the recipient of grants and awards.  His photographs are housed in museum collections worldwide.  His commercial and corporate work has been seen on covers of national publications such as Business Week, Forbes and Black Enterprise magazines as well as within the Annual Reports of corporate boards and clients within the music industry.

Marching Bands
Allen's most prominent project, The Black Marching Band, depicts the Morgan State University marching band. In this project, Allen uses the marching band to challenge the preconceived ideas of marching bands at the time. Allen also believed the Morgan State band specifically was providing a much more original, almost tribal African American sound. He says, “What I call now the pulse and beat of what they were doing. It all seemed so particular to an African-American sensibility". Allen believed that the marching band gave a very expressive and musical way to express unity and cooperation within the African American community.

Works

Permanent collections

 New Britain Museum of American Art, New Britain, CT
 Agnes B, Paris, France
 Brooklyn Museum, New York, NY
 National Museum of American Art
 Smithsonian Institution, Washington, D.C.
 Museum of Modern Art, New York, NY
 Schomburg Center for Research in Black Culture, New York, NY
 Studio Museum in Harlem, New York, NY
 Queensborough Community College, New York, NY
 Dreyfus Fund, New York, NY
 Overholland Museum, Amsterdam, Netherlands

Exhibitions
 A Little More Towards the Light, Solo Exhibition, Shadow Image Gallery, New York, NY, 1989
 Photography and the Culture Climate, Solo Exhibition, University of Michigan, Ann Arbor, 1989
 Black USA, Group Exhibition, Overhollander Museum, Amsterdam, The Netherlands, 1990
 The Knife, Group Exhibition, Agnes B. Gallery, Paris France, 1990
 Contemporary Urban Images, Group Exhibition Studio Museum in Harlem, New York, NY, 1990
 Mean Streets, Group Exhibition Museum of Modern Art, New York, NY, 1991
 On the Edge, Group Exhibition, Henry Street Settlement House, New York, NY, 1991
 Two Photographers, Group Exhibition, Geneva, Switzerland, 1991
 Home, Group Exhibition, De Meervaart Cultural Center, Amsterdam, The Netherlands, 1991
 Fighting Spirit, Solo Exhibition, Delta Axis Arts Center, Memphis, TN, 1992
 Songs of My People, Group Exhibition, Corcoran Gallery, Washington, D.C., Museum of the City of New York, NY, 1992
 Public Photographs, Solo Exhibition, 60 Bus Shelters Throughout Harlem], NY, Public Art Fund, New York, NY, 1992
 Hats and Hat Nots, Solo Exhibition, QCC Art Gallery, CUNY, Bayside, Queens, NY, 1993
 In the Ring, Solo Exhibition, Snug Harbor Cultural Center & Newhouse Center for Contemporary Art, Staten Island, NY, 1993
 Our Town, Group Exhibition, Burden Gallery, New York, NY, 1993
 Gesture and Pose, Group Exhibition, Museum of Modern Art, New York, NY, 1994
 Hats and Hat Nots, Solo Exhibition, Drew University, New Jersey, 1995
 Million Man March, Group Exhibition, Del Pryor Galleries, Detroit, MI, 1997
 Domestic Abuse Awareness Project, Group Exhibition & Auction, Kent Gallery, New York, NY, 1997
 Icon to Narrative: Harlem, Group Exhibition, IRADAC Center, New York, NY, 1998
 Living for the City, Group Traveling Exhibition, Parsons School of Design, New York, NY, 1997
 Americanos: Latino Life in the United States, Group Exhibition, and Museum of the City of New York, NY, 1999
 Black New Yorkers/ Black New York, Group Exhibition, Schomburg Center, New York, NY, 1999
 Harlem, Group Exhibition, Leica Gallery, New York, NY, 2000
 Committed to the Image, Group Exhibition, Brooklyn Museum of Art, New York, NY, 2001
 Life of the City, Group Exhibition, Permanent Collection, Museum of Modern Art, New York, NY, 2002
 Americanos, Group Exhibition, Smithsonian Institution, shown in 26 cities; Washington DC, New York, Chicago, San Antonio, Houston, Austin, Los Angeles, Omaha, St. Petersburg, Tucson, Milwaukee, Boston, Charlotte, 2002
 African American Masters, American Museum of Natural History, Traveling Exhibition, 2004
 Imagines Havana, Group Exhibition of Latin, Caribbean and U.S. photographers, Santiago/ Havana, Cuba, co-sponsored by Fototeca, Royal Nederland's Embassy and The Washington Post, 2004
 Photographs: Jules Allen, Solo Exhibition, Institute of African Affairs, NY University, New York, NY, 2006
 Marching Bands Exhibit, Solo Exhibition, The Jazz Gallery, New York, NY, 2006
 Propositions on the Permanent Collection, Group Exhibition, Studio Museum of Harlem, New York, NY, 2009
 Leica Gallery, "Double Up" Solo Exhibition, New York, NY, November 16, 2012 through January 5, 2013

Awards & Presentations
 Award, CAPS, Photography, New York, NY, 1980
 Photography Grant, New York Foundation for the Arts, New York, NY, 1985
 Fine Arts Panelist, Massachusetts Council on the Arts, Boston, MA, 1986
 Judge, Photography Panel, New York Foundation for the Arts, NY, 1986
 Grant, Light Work, Syracuse, NY, 1986
 Panelist, Society for Photographic Education, Santa Fe, NM, 1990
 Photography Grant, New York Foundation for the Arts, 1991
 Award,  New York Council of the Arts, & Public Art Fund Presentation; “60 Bus Stop Shelters,” City College of New York, NY, 1992
 Research & Photography Grant Funding, City University of New York, NY, New York Foundation for the Arts, NY, 1994–99; 2001
 Imagines Havana, Documentary Photography Panel, Seminar for Latin, Caribbean and US photographers; co-sponsored by The Washington Post and Fototeca, 2003
 Research & Photography Grant Funding,  CETL Grants & Awards City University of New York, NY, 2003
 Research & Photography Grant Funding,  CETL Grants & Awards City University of New York, NY, 2004–2009
 Lecture,  Hatch Billups Artist & Influence, New York, NY, 2009
 Portfolio, "Killens Review of Arts & Letters, Fall/Winter 2010"
 SOHO Photo Gallery, PhotoGroup Salon, Group Lecture, New York, NY, January 18, 2012
 Southeast Queens Camera Club, Jamaica, NY, Lecture April 17, 2012
 International Center of Photography, New York Street Stories, Lecture/Seminar, New York, NY, May 11, 2012
 Excellence in Faculty Scholarship Award, Queensborough Community College, April 20, 2012
 QCC Presidential Lecture: Jules T. Allen: Conjure, Light, Forward Momentum BaysidePatch.com, April 2, 2013

References

External links 
 Jules Allen Photography
 Queensborough Community College, Art & Photography
 Smithsonian American Art Museum, African American Masters
 Smithsonian American Art Museum, Renwick Gallery
 Hats and HatNots
 Black Bodies
 "Double Up: Photographs by Jules Allen"

1947 births
American contemporary artists
American photographers
African-American photographers
Living people
Artists from San Francisco
City University of New York faculty
Queensborough Community College faculty
21st-century African-American people
20th-century African-American people